Midway is an unincorporated community in Pickett County, Tennessee, United States. 

Midway is located within Monroe's zip code.

References

Unincorporated communities in Pickett County, Tennessee
Unincorporated communities in Tennessee